Alisha Morrison (born April 23, 1986) is a Canadian actress known for roles in Harriet the Spy and Mean Girls.

Biography
Morrison was born in Toronto, Ontario, Canada. She started acting in film at age seven and has continued to act into adulthood. Morrison has acted in live-stage, television, and film. She appeared in the 1993 Toronto revival of Show Boat as one of the children.

Morrison attended the Cardinal Carter Academy for the Arts, in Toronto, where she was a drama major. She won the drama award as she graduated. She appeared in many plays at the school, including A Midsummer Night's Dream as lead, Annie as supporting lead, and The Music Man as ensemble.

In 2004, Morrison appeared in the comedic film Mean Girls. She originally auditioned for the role of Gretchen Wieners (played by Lacey Chabert), but was cast as Lea Edwards, one of the "unfriendly black hotties." Morrison stated she and Lindsay Lohan bonded on set because they were some of the youngest cast members.

In 2008, Morrison was a guest of the Toronto International Film Festival, noting her work in Mean Girls and Soul Food.

Morrison is represented by Premier Artists' Mgmt. Inc. As of early 2021, she works at a gold mining company in Canada.

Filmography

External links

References

21st-century Canadian actresses
Black Canadian actresses
Actresses from Toronto
Living people
1986 births